Sergio Boris González Monteagudo (born 26 May 1980), commonly known as Boris, is a Spanish footballer who plays mainly as a central defender.

He amassed La Liga totals of 129 matches and one goal over seven seasons, playing for Oviedo,
Real Sociedad and Numancia. He added 114 appearances in Segunda División, in a 20-year senior career.

Club career
Born in Avilés, Asturias, Boris was a youth product of local Real Oviedo's youth ranks. He appeared once for the first team during 1998–99, a 0–3 La Liga away loss against Valencia CF on 29 May 1999, and became first choice for the subsequent seasons as the team suffered top-flight relegation in 2001.

Boris then joined Real Sociedad, being an historic signing as he was the first Spanish native player from outside the Basque Country to be signed by the club for 35 years. After appearing in 25 games in the side's runner-up campaign in the league, he played almost no part in the following years, also serving an unassuming loan stint with Córdoba CF (second division) in 2004–05, where he was inclusively ousted from the squad for more than two months.

Released, Boris signed with CD Numancia of the same level, being a key defensive element as the team from Soria returned to the top tier in 2008 after a three-year hiatus. In June 2011, after a total of 18 league appearances in his last two seasons – just three matches in the latter – the 31-year-old left the Nuevo Estadio Los Pajaritos and returned to his hometown with his very first football club Real Avilés, in the fourth division.

References

External links

1980 births
Living people
People from Avilés
Spanish footballers
Footballers from Asturias
Association football defenders
La Liga players
Segunda División players
Segunda División B players
Tercera División players
Real Oviedo Vetusta players
Real Oviedo players
Real Sociedad footballers
Córdoba CF players
CD Numancia players
Real Avilés CF footballers
Marino de Luanco footballers
Spain under-21 international footballers